Tian Yuan may refer to:

 Tian Yuan (table tennis) (born 1975), Croatian table tennis player
 Tian Yuan (singer) (born 1985), Chinese singer-songwriter, actress, novelist and photographer
 Tian Yuan (weightlifter) (born 1993), Chinese weightlifter

See also
Tianyuan (disambiguation)